The 2015 Japan Women's Open was a women's tennis tournament played on outdoor hard courts. It was the seventh edition of the Japan Women's Open, and part of the WTA International tournaments of the 2015 WTA Tour. It was held at the Ariake Coliseum in Tokyo, Japan, from September 14 through September 20, 2015. The tournament was moved from Osaka to Tokyo starting this year.

Point distribution

Prize money

1 Qualifiers prize money is also the Round of 32 prize money
2 Per team

Singles main-draw entrants

Seeds

 Rankings are as of August 31, 2015.

Other entrants
The following players received wildcards into the singles main draw:
  Kimiko Date-Krumm
  Nao Hibino
  Carla Suárez Navarro

The following players received entry from the qualifying draw:
  Hiroko Kuwata
  Naomi Osaka
  Risa Ozaki
  Alexandra Panova

Withdrawals
Before the tournament
  Jana Čepelová → replaced by  Kiki Bertens
  Margarita Gasparyan → replaced by  Bojana Jovanovski
  Karin Knapp → replaced by  Misaki Doi
  Anna Karolína Schmiedlová → replaced by  Hsieh Su-wei
  Barbora Strýcová → replaced by  Kateryna Bondarenko

Doubles main-draw entrants

Seeds

1 Rankings are as of August 31, 2015.

Other entrants
The following pairs received wildcards into the doubles main draw:
  Misaki Doi /  Kurumi Nara
  Eri Hozumi /  Miyu Kato

Champions

Singles

 Yanina Wickmayer def.  Magda Linette, 4–6, 6–3, 6–3

Doubles

 Chan Hao-ching /  Chan Yung-jan def.  Misaki Doi /  Kurumi Nara, 6–1, 6–2

External links

 
Japan Women's Open
Japan Women's Open
Japan Women's Open
September 2015 sports events in Japan